Bara Bará Bere Berê (sometimes written with no diacritics as Bara Bara Bere Bere and sometimes reduced to Bara Bara or Bará Berê) is a popular Brazilian song in Portuguese. The refrain is a Bahian protect song created by Dorgival Dantas, with folk dance, rhythmic samba and merengue influences. The song has been subject to various interpretations by a great number of Brazilian artists, and various lyrics and additional music added to the original Dorgival Dantas version.

Before becoming a single in Brazil and internationally in 2012, "Bara Bara Bere Berê" had already been playing since 2008, in various shows and on Brazilian radio stations, with various sertanejo artist interpretations. Best-known versions include those by Aviões do Forró, Cristiano Araújo and Léo Rodriguez.

In Brazil, the first release as a digital single was that of Michel Teló. On 24 July 2012, Teló said in an interview with the television program Encontro com Fátima Bernardes that the launch was ready with new dance moves and would be available in Europe on 13 July 2012. The European releases included an EP with five different tracks of the song, the original radio version, another by Mister Jam and three by DJ Class.

The European and world charts have seen versions by Alex Ferrari in France, Belgium, Russia, Spain and Switzerland, by Leo Rodríguez in the Netherlands and the Dutch-language market in Belgium and a version by Michel Teló in Austria, Belgium, Germany, Spain and the Netherlands.

Alex Ferrari version

The Brazilian singer Alex Ferrari registered it with Music Edition: Jeff Records and recorded it in March 2011 and interpreted it on many occasions in his home country. His version gained most popularity though on European night venues. As his version made rounds online, it was erroneously attributed at times to Michel Teló, although it was eventually proven as being a version recorded by Alex Ferrari himself.

A studio version he produced was released in August 2012 by EMI Music France, having charted in France, where it peaked at #1 as at week-ended 19 August 2012, making Ferrari the third Brazilian act to top the French Singles Chart in 2012, after Michel Teló and Gusttavo Lima.

Charts

Weekly charts

Year-end charts

Leo Rodriguez version

In addition to the hit version by Alex Ferrari, the version was performed by Leo Rodriguez, (sometimes with the diacritic as Leo Rodríguez) who recorded it in February 2012 and released it on Brazilian Sony label Sony Edições accompanied by a music video. His version contains additional lyrics in Portuguese co-written by Rodriguez with Silvio Rodrígues.

His version was released in Europe on 19 June 2012 and has charted in the Netherlands simultaneously to Alex Ferrari version charting in France. The Rodriguez version was released on Spinnin label in the Netherlands making it to #56 on chart dated 1 September 2012.

Charts

Michel Teló version

On 13 July 2012, the Brazilian artist Michel Teló also released his rendition of the song, entitled "Bara Bará Bere Berê" as a download. It was also sent to many Brazilian radio stations for airplay. The Teló version has also charted in the Netherlands, although the Leo Rodríguez version has proven more popular in the country. Teló's "Bara Bará" reached #60, whereas Leo Rodríguez version has reached #56.

The version with songwriting credits to Dorgival Dantas de Paiva was produced by  Dudu Borges
On 24 July 2012, Teló performed it live on Brazilian television variety show Encontro com Fátima Bernardes.

The version is also available in EP that contains five tracks of the song, including three mix versions by DJ Class, one mix version by Mister Jam and the radio version.

Formats
Single track list (digital) 
"Bara Bará Bere Berê" (2:45)

EP track list
"Bará Bará Berê Berê" (a Class edit) – Michel Teló (2:45)
"Bará Bará Berê Berê" – Michel Teló (2:45)
"Bará Bará Berê Berê" (a Class floor mix) – Michel Telo (4:06)
"Bará Bará Berê Berê" (a Class special radio mix) – Michel Teló (2:46)
"Bará Bará Berê Berê" (Mister Jam summer remix) – Michel Teló (2:45)

Weekly charts

Year-end charts

Certifications

Release history
Austria: Digital download (27 July 2012, Sony Music) 
Austria: Digital download of remix EP (10 August 2012, Sony Music) 
Germany: Digital download of remix EP (10 August 2012, Sony Music)
Spain: Digital download (7 August 2012, Sony Music) 
Italy: Digital download (13 July 2012 Sony Music)
Netherlands: Digital download (26 July 2012, CNR Music)
Switzerland: Digital download (27 July 2012 Roster Music)

Other versions
Puerto Rican reggaeton singer Don Omar and Lucenzo released Danza Kuduro which the song with same melody, but the song is not related to Bara Bara. The song was released in 2008 before This song which is released in 2010.

2011 and earlier
Prior to the Alex Ferrari / Leo Rodriguez / Michel Teló hit, the song had been performed by various Brazilian formations in the second half of 2000 (around 2007 onwards).

Versions from 2011 and prior period include those by Aviões do Forró, Lenno & Lincoln, Real de Ouro all as "Bara Bará Bere Berê", Zezinho Desmantelado do Forró as "Beré Bará" and Bagaceiros do Forró at Kabanas Hall as "Barabarababá Bereberebebê".

2012 versions
Based on the widespread popularity of the song, the song lived a revival with sertanejo-style arrangements of the tune. In addition to the European hit versions by Alex Ferrari, Leo Rodriguez and Michel Teló, it has been performed by various artists including very notably by Cristiano Araújo who reinterpreted the song in recording released on 10 May 2012 on "Som Livre" label as "Bara Berê" using tradition Bahia sound. He also sang it live accompanied by the famous sertanejo duo Bruno & Marrone.

Other 2012 versions include Marcos & Fernando with João Neto & Frederico interpreting it as "Bará Berê". This was released on Universal Music label.

2013 version
A version titled "Bará Berê" was produced by Bozzetto and recorded by Iciar Díaz, a female singer, showing a clear fusion of guitar with accordion, giving the song a new style.

Indonesian television variety show Yuk Keep Smile also uses the song for one of its dances.

References

2012 singles
Portuguese-language songs
SNEP Top Singles number-one singles
Michel Teló songs
Year of song missing
2008 songs